Artech Information Systems is an IT staffing firm.

History
Artech Information Systems was co-founded in 1992 by Ajay and Ranjini Poddar, and is headquartered in Morristown, New Jersey. Early clients for the company included the Port Authority of New York and New Jersey and General Electric. Artech matches candidates with client firms based on their demands for special skills. Ranjini Poddar serves as the company’s CEO. 

Artech is the largest woman-owned IT staffing company in the US, and has around 10,500 employees. The company also provides project management services, focusing on women and minority hires. By 2011, it was operating in Canada, forty US states, China, and India, with $328.3 million in revenues, growing 83% since the following year. In 2020, Artech was the subject to a ransomware attack that affected its personnel database.

Affiliations
Artech is a cofounder of a women-focused information technology center at Banasthali Vidyapeeth University in Rajasthan, India, called the Artech-Dalmia Centre for Information Technology. In 2014 Artech acquired Vega Consulting and in 2017 Artech acquired Tech-Pro Inc. In 2018 Artech acquired the talent and technology services business unit of CDI.

References

External links
 

Business services companies established in 1992
Employment agencies of the United States
Companies based in Morris County, New Jersey
Morristown, New Jersey
American companies established in 1992